The 1931–32 Maltese First Division was the 21st season of top-tier football in Malta.  It was contested by 4 teams, and Valletta United won the championship.

League standings

Results

References
Malta - List of final tables (RSSSF)

Maltese Premier League seasons
Malta
Football
Football